Sir James Henry Gunson  (26 October 1877 – 12 May 1963) was a New Zealand businessman and Mayor of Auckland City from 1915 to 1925. He was knighted in 1924.

W Gunson & Co
Born and educated in Auckland, in his mid-twenties he took over W Gunson & Co, the seed-grain and produce business his father founded in 1881. William Gunson died in 1902.  In October 1916, now mayor of Auckland, James sold his father's stock and station agency to Wright Stephenson.

Public life
James Gunson stood for Parliament several times without success; (Roskill in 1919, Eden in 1926 and then Auckland Suburbs in 1928).

Auckland
Mayor from 1915 to 1925 he undertook the building of the war memorials Auckland Museum and Cenotaph, the Wintergardens in Auckland Domain and the construction of Tamaki Drive. In later public life, he was responsible for the monument on One Tree Hill (Maungakiekie) and the treeplanting of Cornwall Park fulfilling Sir John Logan Campbell's vision. Gunson was Chairman of the Auckland Harbour Board 1911–15, and was a member of the Government Railways Board 1931–35.

The Auckland War Memorial Museum's architects commissioned Kohn's Jewellers of Queen Street to create a finely detailed silver model of the museum. This was presented to Gunson upon completion of the museum, in recognition of his extensive work in leading the project. After the death of Sir James, the model was presented to the museum by his son Wallace Gunson, where it remains on display to this day.

Several parts of the city bear his name or were his gift. His farming property to the South of Auckland in Manukau, called Totara Park, was later given to the city of Auckland. His main town residence, in St Andrew's Road, Epsom, became the Tongan royal residence, which it remains.  A further Auckland property (named Rydal Mount after the residence of the English poet William Wordsworth) was by the same architect, Draffin, that Gunson had chosen to design Auckland Museum. Gunson Street, in Freemans Bay, Auckland, is named after him.

Honours and awards
Gunson was appointed an Officer of the Order of the British Empire in March 1918, for services in connection with the war, and promoted to Commander of the Order of the British Empire in the 1919 King's Birthday Honours, for services in connection with patriotic undertakings. He was made a Companion of the Order of St Michael and St George in the 1922 New Year Honours. In the 1924 King's Birthday Honours, Gunson was appointed a Knight Bachelor, in recognition of his public services. In 1935, he was awarded the King George V Silver Jubilee Medal.

Family
He married Jessie Helen Wiseman (later Lady Gunson ) in 1905. They had three children; William, Geoffrey and Margaret, the last of whom married British barrister Sir Rawden Temple. His brother Edward Burton Gunson  (1883–1950) practised as a cardiologist in Auckland 1919–37. During World War One while in the RAMC EB Gunson assisted Thomas Lewis, the noted clinical scientist, in achieving an improved understanding of the Effort Syndrome. During World War Two Gunson worked for the Ministry of Supply in London publishing studies of women war workers' health.

References

Who’s Who in New Zealand, 4th edition 1941
Who's Who (UK/World edition), 1954

1877 births
1963 deaths
New Zealand stock and station agents
Mayors of Auckland
New Zealand businesspeople
Reform Party (New Zealand) politicians
Unsuccessful candidates in the 1919 New Zealand general election
Unsuccessful candidates in the 1928 New Zealand general election
New Zealand Companions of the Order of St Michael and St George
New Zealand Commanders of the Order of the British Empire
New Zealand Knights Bachelor
Auckland Harbour Board members
New Zealand politicians awarded knighthoods